Clinton F. Hesler Farm, also known as Clearview Farm, is a historic home and farm and national historic district located at Millcreek Township, Fountain County, Indiana. The farmhouse was built in 1896, and is a two-story, "T"-plan, Queen Anne style balloon frame dwelling. It features steep gable roofs, a wraparound porch, fishscale shingles, and elaborate millwork.  Also on the property are the contributing horse barn (1887), cattle barn (c. 1910), corn crib (c. 1910), summerhouse (1896), and cast-iron fence (1896).

It was listed on the National Register of Historic Places in 1989.

References

Farms on the National Register of Historic Places in Indiana
Historic districts on the National Register of Historic Places in Indiana
Queen Anne architecture in Indiana
Houses completed in 1896
Houses in Fountain County, Indiana
Historic districts in Fountain County, Indiana
National Register of Historic Places in Fountain County, Indiana